Bakuvians Walk in the City Park is a 1900 Azerbaijani film directed by Q. Matye. It was filmed on November 12, 1900, the same day Matye shot The Life of Bakuvians and Their Movement Along the Velikokniaz Avenue. The film was released on November 19, 1900, in Baku.

The film was shot on 35mm.

See also
List of Azerbaijani films: 1898-1919

1900 films
Azerbaijani silent films
Azerbaijani black-and-white films
Films of the Russian Empire